Remraam is the residential community in Dubai, UAE. The Remraam development is located on Emirates Road E611 near D61 Highway. Plans for the development included 198 buildings and make it one of the largest construction sites in the UAE but this was later scaled down. Upon completion it was to include a Community Mall, covered parking, outdoor swimming pools, nurseries, gym, sauna, tennis and basketball courts and a clubhouse.

References 
Official website
2020 Khaleej Times Article
Livenreal.com
Dubaicityguide.com
Facebook Page
Facebook Group
2012 Gulf news article

Communities in Dubai